Abdelhakim Bitat (born 4 June 1964) is an Algerian swimmer. He competed in the men's 4 × 200 metre freestyle relay at the 1980 Summer Olympics.

References

External links
 

1964 births
Living people
Olympic swimmers of Algeria
Swimmers at the 1980 Summer Olympics
Place of birth missing (living people)
Algerian male freestyle swimmers
21st-century Algerian people